Vapar Sar (also known as Vafar Sar) is a village in Rahimabad Rural District, Rahimabad District, Rudsar County, Gilan Province, Iran. At the 2006 census, its population was 24, in 5 families.

References 

Populated places in Rudsar County